Boom Dot Bust is a comedy album recorded by the Firesign Theatre and released in 1999 on Rhino Records. It was a follow-up to the highly praised Give Me Immortality or Give Me Death from the previous year, continuing a brief resurgence of the foursome's legendary success from 1968–75.

It chronicles life in the fictional small Midwestern town of Billville ("The Town That Nature Forgot to Hate"), where every male resident's first name is some form of William, including mayor William Cudlip P'nisnose (Peter Bergman), who has telekenetic powers; Bill Swatt (David Ossman), coach of the local team the No-neckers, who play some unspecified sport; developer W. Sprawl (Philip Proctor); and family physician Dr. Guillermo Infermo (Phil Austin). Martial-arts film star Charlie Fatt (Austin) is a celebrity guest passing through town, and the nearby Elmertown attempts to grow and compete.

The "Bill" theme is most obviously construed as a reference to then-President Bill Clinton as representative of America, but it also can be taken to include Bill Gates, as a broader allusion to the seeming ubiquity of the name Bill in the news at the time, and because the word "billionaire" occurs.  The notion of "Billville", however, was originally introduced in the song "Oh! Afghanistan!" on Fighting Clowns.

This has also been issued as a DVD-Audio in 5.1 Surround sound.

1999 albums
The Firesign Theatre albums
Rhino Records albums
1990s comedy albums